Hans Gebien 4 October 1874, Horn, Hamburg- 9 October 1947, Großhansdorf) was a German entomologist who specialised in Tenebrionidae (Coleoptera). 
His collections are in Biozentrum Grindel und Zoologisches Museum, Hamburg, the Natural History Museum of Basel, and in Museo Civico di Storia Naturale di Milano (both ex Museum G. Frey Tutzing).

Works

Gebien, H. 1910–11: Tenebrionidae 1–4. Trictenotomidae. Coleopterorum catalogus 22. 169–354; 28: 355–585.
Gebien, H. 1925: Die Tenebrioniden (Coleoptera) des IndoMalayischen Gebietes. Philippine journal of science 28: 101–128.
Gebien, H. 1938–42: Katalog der Tenebrioniden, Teil II. Mitteilungen der münchener entomologischer Gesellschaft 28: 49–80, 283–314, 397–428; 29: 443–474; 30: 405–436; 32: 729–760.

External links
 Correspondence of Hans Gebien with his wife

References
Nonveiller, G. 1999: The Pioneers of the research on the Insects of Dalmatia. Zagreb, Hrvatski Pridodoslovni Muzej, 1–390

German entomologists